John Duffy (24 April 1922 – 10 April 1996) was a Scottish footballer, who played as a right back in the Scottish League for Clyde, in the English Football League for Norwich City, and in English non-league football for Great Yarmouth Town.

References

1922 births
1996 deaths
Footballers from Glasgow
Scottish footballers
Association football fullbacks
Clyde F.C. players
Norwich City F.C. players
Great Yarmouth Town F.C. players
Scottish Football League players
English Football League players